The Mosope River is a natural watercourse in Botswana, passing  through the village of Moshupa. The Mosope River joins the Kolobeng River to form Metsimotlhaba which joins Notwane River around Mochudi, and continues to the Limpopo River.

See also
 Sua Pan

References
 Republic of Botswana, Daily News Archive. 2006. 
 C.Michael Hogan. 2008. Makgadikgadi, The Megalithic Portal, ed. A. Burnham

Line notes

Rivers of Botswana
Makgadikgadi Pan